Manharlal Bhikhalal Shah (born 25 September 1938) is an Indian Judge and former Justice of the Supreme Court of India.

Early life
Shah was born in 1938 at Dehgam in Ahmedabad District of Gujarat. He passed SSC Examination in 1953 and joined  L.D. Arts College of Ahmedabad. Shah became graduated in Economics in 1958 and in 1962 he completed M.Com. in Statistics. In 1962, he passed LL.B. from Sir L.A. Shah Law College.

Career
Shah started practice in 1963 in the Gujarat High Court on Constitutional, Civil and Criminal matters. He also served as a lecturer in Motilal Nehru Law College since September 1971. He was appointed Assistant Government Pleader and Public Prosecutor in Gujarat High Court. On 28 January 1983, Shah was appointed Additional Judge of the same High Court. On 2 August 1995, he became the Chief Justice of the Bombay High Court. Justice Shah was elevated as Judge of the Supreme Court of India on 9 December 1998 and retired on 24 September 2003 from the post. He was appointed the Chairman of the Special Investigation Team looking into the black money issue in India. In 2016, Justice Shah published a book named Commentary on Law of Mines & Minerals.

References

1938 births
Living people
Indian judges
Justices of the Supreme Court of India
Judges of the Gujarat High Court
Chief Justices of the Bombay High Court
People from Ahmedabad
20th-century Indian judges
20th-century Indian lawyers
21st-century Indian judges